Townsend is a area of Bournemouth, Dorset. It is located in the suburbs along the north eastern boundary of the town and is close to the Royal Bournemouth Hospital.

History 
Townsend is a housing estate and was built in the mid 1970s.

Politics 
Townsend is part of the Muscliff and Strouden Park ward for elections to Bournemouth, Christchurch and Poole Council which elect three councillors.

Townsend is part of the Bournemouth East parliamentary constituency, for elections to the House of Commons of the United Kingdom.

External links 

 Townsend YMCA

References 

Areas of Bournemouth
1970s establishments in England
Populated places established in the 1970s